A vacuum coffee maker brews coffee using two chambers where vapor pressure and gravity produce coffee. This type of coffee maker is also known as vac pot, siphon or syphon coffee maker, and was invented by Loeff of Berlin in the 1830s. These devices have since been used for more than a century in many parts of the world. Design and composition of the vacuum coffee maker varies.  The chamber material is borosilicate glass, metal, or plastic, and the filter can be either a glass rod or a screen made of metal, cloth, paper, or nylon. The Napier Vacuum Machine, presented in 1840, was an early example of this technique. While vacuum coffee makers generally were excessively complex for everyday use, they were prized for producing a clear brew, and were quite popular until the middle of the twentieth century. Vacuum coffee makers remain popular in some parts of Asia, including Japan and Taiwan. The Bauhaus interpretation of this device can be seen in Gerhard Marcks'  coffee maker of 1925.

Workings

A vacuum coffee maker operates as a siphon, where heating and cooling the lower vessel changes the vapor pressure of water in the lower, first pushing the water up into the upper vessel, then allowing the water to fall back down into the lower vessel. 

Specifically, once the water in lower chamber is hot enough that its vapor pressure (the pressure exerted by the vapour component of a liquid) exceeds the pressure of a standard atmosphere, some of it begins to boil, turning into water vapor. Since the density of water vapor is about 1/2000 that of liquid water, the mixture of the air and water vapor in the lower chamber quickly expands, and, when the new pressure exceeds atmospheric pressure, pushes the remaining water up the siphon tube into the upper chamber, where it remains so long as the pressure difference between the upper and lower chambers is sufficient to support it (about 1.5 kPa or 0.015 atm).  This pressure difference is maintained during brewing through the continuous heating of the lower chamber. Coffee grinds are added to the water in the upper chamber.

When the coffee has finished brewing (around 60 sec), the heat is removed and the pressure in the bottom vessel drops, so the force of gravity (acting on the water) overcomes the pressure difference of the chambers and the coffee slurry drops into the lower chamber through a filter, ending brewing. The coffee can then be decanted from the lower chamber; the device must usually be taken apart to pour out the coffee.

The iconic Moka pot coffee maker functions on the same principle but the water is forced up from the bottom chamber through a third middle chamber containing the coffee grounds to the top chamber which has an air gap to prevent the brewed coffee from returning downwards. (Additionally, because the water is forced up through packed grounds, the pressures are greater.)  The prepared coffee is then poured off from the top.

Misconception 

Note that siphons work by pushing (the water is under pressure – see hydrostatic pressure), not under tension, and it is the changing vapor pressure in the lower vessel, combined with the constant atmospheric pressure in the upper vessel that drive the siphon. When the water cools the pressure in the lower vessel drops as steam condenses into dense water, taking up less volume and hence dropping the pressure.

Balance siphon 
An early variation of this principle is called a balance siphon. This implementation has the two chambers arranged side by side on a balance-like device, with a counterweight attached to the heated chamber.  Once the vapor has forced the hot water out, the counterweight activates a spring-loaded snuffer which smothers the flame and allows the initial chamber to cool down thus lowering pressure (creating a vacuum) and causing the brewed coffee to seep in.

Automated version 
In 2022, Japanese Tiger Corporation was working on an automated coffee-maker based on the vacuum coffee maker principle, the Siphonysta. The Siphonysta's heating is electrical. The chambers are made of plastic ("resin").

Gallery of process

See also
 
 Minto wheel

References

External links
Vac Pot How-To pdf
Siphon Brewer In Operation:Sydney Australia

Coffee preparation
Vacuum
Fluid dynamics